The Karlskrona Coastal Artillery Regiment, designation KA 2, was a Swedish Navy coastal artillery regiment of the Swedish Armed Forces which operated between 1902 and 2000. The unit was based in Karlskrona.

Locations

Vallgatan (1902–1943)
When KA 2 was raised on 1 January 1902, the regiment took over the area on Vallgatan, which since 1895 has been used by Karlskrona Artillery Corps. The Artillery Corps was raised in 1893 and from the beginning had its main location at Kungsholmen with units located at Oscarsvärn and at Västra Hästholmen. The units, which had to man the fortifications before the artillery corps, had from the beginning been on Kungsholmen and Drottningskär. Västra Hästholmen and Oscarsvärn became permanent places around 1870 at the same time as Drottningskär was de-manned. In 1895, the barracks at Vallgatan were completed (Northern Barracks) and shortly thereafter the so-called Underofficershuset with housing for the non-commissioned officers of the Artillery Corps. Furthermore, the Exercishuset was built immediately west of the barracks. In order to build these buildings, large parts of Erik Dahlbergh's fortress wall from the early 18th century had to be demolished. Where the main entrance to the area was located, in the middle of the Northern barracks, once stood the Achilles bastion, the second bastion from the east, in Dahlbergh's fortifications.

KA 2 was almost immediately cramped and the planning and work on another barracks took off. In 1905, the Southern Barracks, was completed and in order to be able to build it one had to demolish the Naval Shipyard's old arsenal from the 1730s. A new arsenal was built at the same time as the Southern Barracks. This was much further south than the old one. Parallel to the city barracks on Vallgatan, among other things, the outer installations were used the same way as the Artillery Corps had used them. Exterior changes hardly happened as long as KA 2 remained on site. The interiors were changed that characterized the first half of the 20th century (electricity, water supply, central heating, etc.). In 1943 KA 2 left Vallgatan and headed north towards Gräsvik. The move came after a lengthy procedure. The Flottans sjömansskola ("Swedish Navy Seaman's School") was to be established in Karlskrona and the issue was long between this school and KA 2 about Gräsvik. It was KA 2 that got Gräsvik and in August 1943, the regiment left Vallgatan and moved north. The chief spokesman for the move was undoubtedly the then regimental commander, colonel Gösta Möller.

Oscarsvärn (1902–1973)
The area between the Sunna Canal and the current Oscarsvärnsvägen, originally called Hvita Krog, began to be fortified in 1709. The fortifications, called Oscarsvärnslinjerna, received its first peace-time crew in 1896, when Karlskrona Artillery Corps's 4th Company was placed here. When Karlskrona Coastal Artillery Regiment was raised in 1902, the tasks of this unit were taken over and Oscarsvärn became the location and training area for KA 2's mobile artillery and vehicle training. This training moved to Rosenholm in the fall of 1973 and Oscarsvärn were handed over to Karlskrona Municipality on 6 December 1973. In connection with this, a stone was erected with a plaque commemorating the military activities at Oscarsvärn.

Gräsvik (1943–1981)
The Defence Act of 1925 meant a proper disarmament of the Swedish Armed Forces. One of the regiments that was affected was Karlskrona Grenadier Regiment which was disbanded on 31 December 1927. On 1 January 1928, the Karlskrona Grenadier Regiment was replaced by a detachment from Kronoberg Regiment (I 11 K). The strength was at its peak at around 1,000 men. In essence, the Northern Barracks was used as accommodation. The Defence Act of 1936 meant that I 11 K would be disbanded, but before the decision was enforced, World War II began. Despite this, the disbandment was completed and on 26 September 1939, a solemn disbandment ceremony was held at Gräsvik. In connection with Germany's occupation of Denmark and Norway, the Landstorm was drafted to set up shore defense battalions and to be responsible for certain air surveillance. These were placed in the empty Gräsvik barracks. Karlskrona Coastal Artillery Regiment, which was located on Vallgatan, was too crowded and had been for many years. After a necessary and thorough renovation, which took place in 1942–1943, the regiment moved in in August 1943. As early as 1942, KA 2's mobile preparedness units had disposed of the barracks on the upper floor, when they occasionally returned from preparedness service. The barracks were used only for accommodation. Other activities took place at Oscarsvärn. After KA 2 took Gräsvik into possession, a certain number of additions and rebuilds took place. In general, however, the facility remained unchanged, at least to its exterior. New buildings that were completed were the canteen building at Dannemarksfjärden in 1946, remodeling and extension of the gun hall on the upper floor to the Mechanics School and a new vehicle and machinery hall in the 1970s. Otherwise, the old buildings from the time of the Karlskrona Grenadier Regiment were used, where the oldest, the non-commissioned officers' mess and the clothing storage, had been moved to the site from Bredåkra. In the spring of 1980, the Eastern Barracks was leased to Karlskrona Municipality to accommodate parts of the upper secondary school. Eventually, the Northern Barracks for a short time also became a secondary school undergoing redevelopment on Trossö. On 23 October 1981, the naval ensign on Gräsvik was lowered for the last time at a simple ceremony. Smaller parts of the regiment remained until 1983-1984 and the following year the area was sold with buildings to Karlskrona Municipality.

Rosenholm (1973–2000)
In 1915, the military activities in the Rosenholms area started, when the farms Rosenholm and Silletorp were purchased on behalf of the Swedish crown. The acquisition was the result of Karlskrona Grenadier Regiment (I 7) being expanded from two to three battalions during the World War I. The regiment exercised in the area until 1927, when a detachment from Kronoberg Regiment (I 11 K) took over the area and remained there until September 1939. During the first years of World War II, the area was used as a location and training area for the drafted Landstormen. KA 2 also disposed the field and during World War II, it was mainly the mobile coastal artillery units that utilized the Rosenholms area during their recovery periods. The Swedish Navy also carried out ground combat exercises in Rosenholm during certain periods. Until the end of the 1960s, the Swedish crown had only the area south of the Silletorpsån. In 1967, three properties were purchased north of Silletorpsån, Måstad, Stenshaga and Bubbetorp. The training area thus increased from 2.7 km2 to 7 km2, a need caused by the decision to change conscription training (VU 60). At the same time, the first new building, the missile school, was being built. In 1972, new construction of barracks and military restaurant buildings commenced, and when this first stage was completed, KA 2 left Oscarsvärn in autumn 1973. In Rosenholm, extensive construction work continued into the 1990s. In 1981 the majority of the regiment moved from Gräsvik to Rosenholm and in 1983 the regimental staff moved in.

Heraldry and traditions

Colours, standards and guidons
The regimental colour was presented to the former Royal Karlskrona Coastal Artillery Regiment (KA 2) at the Stockholm Palace in Stockholm by His Majesty the King Gustaf V on 1 June 1945. It was used as regimental colour by KA 2 until 1 July 2001. The regimental commander, Colonel Alf Nyman, received the colour from the hands of the king. In connection with the disbandment ceremony on 31 October 2000, the colour was handed over to the South Coast Naval Base, which is the unit that will carry forward the traditions of the Karlskrona Coastal Artillery Regiment.

The regimental colour was drawn by Brita Grep and embroidered by hand in insertion technique by the company Libraria. Blazon: "On red cloth in the centre the badge of the former Coastal Artillery; two gunbarrels of older pattern in saltire between a royal crown proper and a blazing grenade and waves, all in yellow. In the first corner the monogram of HM King Carl XI surmounting an erect anchor under a royal crown proper, all in yellow".

Coat of arms
The coat of arms of the Karlskrona Coastal Artillery Regiment (KA 2) was established in 1967. Blazon: "Azure, The monogram of King Charles XI surmounted an erect anchor. The shield surmounted two gunbarrels of older pattern in saltire above a flaming grenade and waves, all or."

Marches
"Kongl Carlskrona artillerikårs marsch" was written in 1895 by Frans Ferdinand Heimdahl (1848–1929) and was adopted the same year. Heimdahl was music director in Karlskrona Artillery Corps from 1895 to 1901, at the Royal Swedish Navy Band in Karlskrona from 1874 to 1914 and in Halland Battalion from 1897 to 1901. When Karlskrona Coastal Artillery Regiment was raised in 1902, the march became the regimental march and remained so until 31 March 1910. In 1992, the march was adopted as a march for the Karlskrona Marine Group (Karlskrona maringrupp) and as such was maintained until the unit's disbandment in 1996. In 2001, the march was again adopted as a unit march, now for the Blekinge Archipelago Home Guard Battalion (Blekinge skärgårdshemvärnsbataljon).

"Kungl Karlskrona kustartilleriregementes marsch" was written in 1910 by the music director at KA 2, August Sjögren (1862–1929). The march was dedicated to the then regimental commander Carl Gustaf Ahlborn, and was adopted as a unit march on 1 April 1910. The march came to remain the regimental march until the disbandment on 31 October 2000. Sjögren served as music director in the regiment from 1905 to 1918.

"KA 2 marschvisa" was added in 1942. The music was composed by Sven-Gösta Elmqvist, reserve officer of the regiment and the text was written by the then lieutenant of the regiment Sven Olof (Ola) Träff, later self-employed and member of the Riksdag.

"Överste Gösta Möller" was written in 1943 by the music director of the regiment Bertil Driwing (1912–1991). The march was dedicated to the outgoing regimental commander Gösta Möller and received the subtitle "Ett lag eld", a regular fire command of the coastal artillery units.

"KA 2-kamrater" was written for KA 2 Kamratförening'''s 50th anniversary by Kjell Rosell (Larsson) (born 1912) and was handed over on the anniversary day 14 June to the then regimental commander and chairman of the Kamratförening, Colonel Roland Hultgren. Kjell Rosell was a musician in KA 2 from 1929 to 1935. His instruments were cornet and trumpet.

"KA 2 jubileumsmarsch" was written for KA 2's 90th anniversary in June 1992 by Eskil Nyström (born 1923). The march was dedicated to the then regimental commander Colonel Bengt-Arne Johansson. Eskil Nyström was a musician in KA 2 from 1943 until the disbandment of the music corps in 1957, when he was transferred to the Royal Swedish Navy Band in Karlskrona. His instruments were clarinet and saxophone. In the march there are loops of both "KA 2 marsch" and "KA 2 marschvisa".

"3. amfibiebataljonens marsch" is also a work by Eskil Nyström. This march was added in 1997, which was the first year when the entire amphibious system was trained in KA 2. The march was dedicated to the then amphibious battalion commander Günter Villman.

"Överste Villman" is also a work by Eskil Nyström and was originally written as an anniversary march for the regiment's 100th anniversary. When the decision to disband the regiment came, the march was renamed to "Överste Villman" and was dedicated to KA 2's last regimental commander, Colonel Günter Villman. In the march, "KA 2 igenkänningssignal" is heard, a few beats of the march song and a few beats of the "Blekingesången", the latter to mark the regiment as a real native regiment.

"KA 2 igenkänningssignal". The recognition signal is intended for clarion (B instrument).

Medals
In 2000, the Karlskrona kustartilleriregementes (KA 2) minnesmedalj'' ("Karlskrona Coastal Artillery Regiment (KA 2) Commemorative Medal") in silver (KarlskronakaregSMM) of the 8th size was established. The medal ribbon is of blue moiré with a broad yellow stripe on the middle followed on both sides by a red stripe.

Commanding officers
During the period that the Karlskrona Coastal Artillery Regiment existed, from 1 January 1902 to 31 October 2000, the regiment had 22 regimental commanders. In addition, there were 2 acting commanders who maintained the position for a longer period of time:

1902-01-01 – 1907-09-05: Otto Ludvig Beckman
1907-09-06 – 1914-12-01: Carl-Gustaf Ahlborn
1914-12-02 – 1924-10-14: Sam Torsten Rudolf Bolling
1924-10-15 – 1925-11-20: John Artur Edström
1925-12-01 – 1929-11-05: Lars Theodor Hasselgren
1929-11-06 – 1935-07-16: Hans Gustaf Malmberg
1940-04-30 – 1941-06-30: Carl Anders Claus (acting)
1935-07-17 – 1941-03-31: Hjalmar Åström
1941-07-01 – 1943-09-30: Gösta Möller
1943-10-01 – 1947-09-30: Alf Nyman
1947-10-01 – 1953-09-30: Sten Puke
1953-10-01 – 1962-06-01: Erik Nordling
1962-06-02 – 1962-09-30: Sven-Eril Bengtson (acting)
1962-10-01 – 1963-09-30: Carl-Fredrik Gillberg
1963-10-01 – 1970-09-30: Birger Ehnrot
1970-10-01 – 1976-09-30: Olof Gäfvert
1976-10-01 – 1978-10-31: Lars Hansson
1978-11-01 – 1980-09-30: Stefan Furenius
1980-10-01 – 1982-01-31: Bengt Ekström
1982-02-01 – 1985-09-30: Kjell Lodenius
1985-10-01 – 1991-09-30: Roland Hultgren
1991-10-01 – 1994-06-30: Bengt-Arne Johansson
1994-07-01 – 1999-05-31: Göran Boijsen
1999-06-01 – 2000-10-31: Günter Villman

Names, designations and locations

See also
List of Swedish coastal artillery regiments

Footnotes

References

Notes

Print

Further reading

Regiments of the Swedish Navy
Military units and formations established in 1902
Military units and formations disestablished in 2000
Disbanded units and formations of Sweden
1902 establishments in Sweden
2000 disestablishments in Sweden
Karlskrona Garrison